Macrocneme is a genus of tiger moths in the family Erebidae. The genus was erected by Jacob Hübner in 1818.

Species

Macrocneme adonis Druce, 1884
Macrocneme albiventer Dognin, 1923
Macrocneme aurifera Hampson, 1914
Macrocneme chrysitis (Guérin-Méneville, [1844])
Macrocneme cinyras Schaus, 1889
Macrocneme coerulescens Dognin, 1906
Macrocneme cupreipennis Walker, 1856
Macrocneme cyanea (Butler, 1876)
Macrocneme euphrasia Schaus, 1924
Macrocneme guyanensis Dognin, 1911
Macrocneme immanis Hampson, 1898
Macrocneme lades (Cramer, [1775])
Macrocneme leucostigma (Perty, 1834)
Macrocneme maja (Fabricius, 1787)
Macrocneme mormo Dietz, 1994
Macrocneme semiviridis Druce, 1911
Macrocneme spinivalva Fleming, 1957
Macrocneme thyra Möschler, 1883
Macrocneme thyridia Hampson, 1898
Macrocneme verdivittata (Klages, 1906)
Macrocneme vidua (Bryk, 1953)
Macrocneme viridis (Druce, 1883)
Macrocneme yepezi Forster, 1949

Former species

Macrocneme albitarsia Hampson, 1898
Macrocneme alesa Druce, 1890
Macrocneme auripes (Walker, 1854)
Macrocneme chrysotarsia Hampson, 1898
Macrocneme eacus (Stoll, [1781])
Macrocneme esmeralda Butler, 1876
Macrocneme evelina Druce, 1884
Macrocneme hesione Druce, 1888
Macrocneme indistincta Butler, 1876
Macrocneme jalapensis (Schaus, 1889)
Macrocneme laciades (Schaus, 1889)
Macrocneme laconia (Druce, 1884)
Macrocneme misitra (Schaus, 1889)
Macrocneme naja (Burmeister, 1878)
Macrocneme nigritarsia Hampson, 1898
Macrocneme vittata (Walker, 1854)

References

 
Euchromiina
Moth genera